Rhydowen Halt railway station served the village of Rhydowen, Ceredigion, Wales, from 1875 to 1962 on the Whitland and Cardigan Railway.

History 
The station was opened on 12 July 1875 by the Whitland and Taf Vale Railway. It was situated south of an unnamed minor road. The original station only had a wooden shed as a station building. A new station was built in 1886. This had a waiting room and a booking office, both made of timber. Opposite the platform was the goods yard with a loop that served a cattle dock. Nearby was a ground frame in a wooden cabin which controlled the adjacent level crossing and allowed access to the goods yard. It was downgraded to a halt in September 1956, thus the suffix 'Halt' was added to its name, but it remained staff to use the ground frame. The station closed on 10 September 1962.

References 

Disused railway stations in Pembrokeshire
Railway stations in Great Britain opened in 1875
Railway stations in Great Britain closed in 1962
1875 establishments in Wales
1962 disestablishments in Wales